Wickramasinghe Archchilage Chandrawathi, known as WA Chandrawathi, (born 27 May 1981) is a former Sri Lankan woman cricketer. She has played for Sri Lanka in five women's One Day Internationals.

References

External links 

1981 births
Living people
Sri Lankan women cricketers
Sri Lanka women One Day International cricketers